Shehzad Afzal is a writer, director, producer, editor, cinematographer and game designer born in Dundee, Scotland.

He produced and directed Bo Kata a documentary film which received a limited UK theatrical release in 2007.

Life

A former graduate of Robert Gordon University, University of Abertay, Edinburgh Napier University and Dundee College, where Shehzad studied Computer Science, Creative Writing, Screen Project Development (Screen Academy Scotland, MA with Distinction), and Management; winning the first prize award for his academic achievements and receiving the prestigious Edinburgh Napier University Class Medal.

He was a finalist in the Global Digital Cities Video Game Design Competition in 2005 and 2007.

In 2010 he was awarded the Abbey Santander Award for Outstanding Achievement in Film and Creative Media.

Shehzad was selected for the Engage Programme, a European-wide talent development program in 2010, developing screen projects, traveling to Ireland, Finland, Estonia, and Scotland, undertaking workshops and masterclasses.

In May 2016, Shehzad attested and became a reservist in the British Army at the age of 47, joining the Corps of Royal Engineers, passing his basic training at Army Training Centre Pirbright in February 2017 aged 48, making him one of the very few people to have accomplished this feat. Retiring from the Army in 2022 and awarded Queen Elizabeth II Platinum Jubilee Medal 2022.

After two films, Ravi Dreams (2003), a documentary about culture and mysticism in Lahore and Transvestite Days(2004), a short film giving a glimpse into the life of a Transvestite in Lahore, Pakistan; Afzal's first collaborative film, shot in Edinburgh, Scotland, 2004, was a short four-minute piece called The Full 10 Yards.

At Screen Academy Scotland, Shehzad produced two award-winning short films, including the first collaboration on a film project between screen academies in the UK (Screen Academy Scotland & Screen Academy Wales).

Nominee for the Satyajit Ray Film Foundation Award for Best Film Award 2007 in association with the British Council and the British Film Institute for documentary film, Bo Kata.

Presented by Sean Connery, the Edinburgh International Film Festival 2009 & Skillset Trailblazer Award which celebrated emerging talent in British Cinema.

In 2019, Shehzad developed an Android Application called Bo Kata Digital, which allowed his documentary, Bo Kata, to be available as a downloadable app available from Amazon App Store and Google Play store.

Filmography

References

External links

Film Production profile from filmedup.com

People from Dundee
Living people
Scottish film directors
Scottish film producers
Scottish screenwriters
Scottish documentary filmmakers
British film editors
British video game designers
British documentary film producers
British documentary film directors
Alumni of Robert Gordon University
Alumni of Abertay University
Alumni of Edinburgh Napier University
Alumni of the Edinburgh College of Art
People educated at Harris Academy
Scottish people of Pakistani descent
Punjabi people
Writers from Dundee
Year of birth missing (living people)